The Wainui River is a river of the Tasman Region of New Zealand's South Island. It flows north through Abel Tasman National Park from its sources on the slopes of Mount Evans to reach the small Wainui Bay, an indentation close to the eastern end of Golden Bay.

The sources of Wainui River near Wainui Saddle are close to the Abel Tasman Inland Track.  Shortly after, the Wainui Track follows its course for a few kilometers, with Wainui Hut situated next to the river.

Wainui Falls can be reached from a car park in Wainui Bay via the gentle Wainui Falls Track.

See also
List of rivers of New Zealand

References

Rivers of the Tasman District
Rivers of New Zealand